Olly Murs is the self-titled debut studio album by the English singer-songwriter Olly Murs. It was released on 23 November 2010 in the United Kingdom.

The album's lead single, "Please Don't Let Me Go", was released on 27 August 2010. The song debuted at number one on the UK Singles Chart. The second single from the album, "Thinking of Me", was released on 22 November 2010, and debuted at number four. The third single "Heart on My Sleeve" was released in March 2011 and peaked at number 20. The song was written by James Morrison and John Shanks. The fourth and final release from the album, "Busy" was released in May 2011 and peaked at number 44. In October 2011, nearly a year after the album's release, BBC Radio 1 listeners voted Olly Murs as "Album of the Year" in the annual Radio 1 Teen Awards.

Background and production
The possibility of an album was first rumoured when Murs finished second place on the sixth series of ITV talent competition, The X Factor. In February 2010, it was announced that Murs had been signed to a 50/50-record deal between Epic Records and Syco Music. Murs has collaborated with John Shanks, Ed Sheeran, Eg White, Roy Stride, Trevor Horn, Wayne Hector, Matty Benbrook, Phil Thornalley, Martin Brammer, Preston, Mark Taylor and Chris Difford on the album. Professor Green was due to appear on the album, however, the duet fell through before recording was completed. "Heart on My Sleeve" is a cover of the song originally recorded by American Idol finalist Michael Johns. Murs performed "Thinking of Me" live on The X Factor on 21 November 2010.

Critical reception

Ruth Harrison of Female First gives the most positive review of the album, saying "Olly has actually engaged his brain, put pen to paper and written tracks that are true to himself and his sound...this album proves that Olly is an artist in his own right". A review by Fraser McAlpine on the BBC Music website gave a heading of 'X Factor runner-up reveals a debut almost as good as his taste in hats.' Hermione Hoby from The Guardian gave a negative review of Olly Murs, saying "the album chugs along with vacant cheer through a series of reggae-inflected songs that don't always make the most of Murs's soulful voice. Other than the slightly awkward stab at scat-singing on "Please Don't Let Me Go" [...] there's not much here to grab the attention."

Commercial performance
The album entered the UK Albums Chart at number two on 5 December 2010, selling 108,000 copies in its first week. The album was kept off the top spot by the third week sales of Take That's Progress which sold over 174,000 copies. In the following three weeks the album sold upwards of 100,000 in each week, making it the fastest selling debut album of 2010 in the UK. On 8 April 2011, the album was certified two-times platinum by the British Phonographic Industry (BPI) for shipments of 600,000 copies in the UK. As of December 2014, the album had sold 815,971 copies in the UK. In Ireland, the album debuted at number eleven. It has since been certified gold by the Irish Recorded Music Association (IRMA) for shipments of 7,500 copies.

Track listing

Notes
  signifies an additional record producer

Charts and certifications

Weekly charts

Year-end charts

Decade-end charts

Certifications

Tour
On 21 November 2010 a UK tour was announced for 2011 to promote the album.

Release history

References

2010 debut albums
Olly Murs albums
Epic Records albums
Albums produced by Steve Robson
Albums produced by Mark Taylor (music producer)
Albums produced by Steve Mac
Albums produced by John Shanks
Albums produced by Trevor Horn